Nabil Amr ( 1947) is a former information minister (2003) in the Palestinian National Authority, and previous ambassador in the USSR and Egypt.  He was an outspoken critic of Yasser Arafat, especially regarding his behavior at the 2000 Camp David Summit.

In July 2004 he was shot in the legs through the window of his house in Ramallah by unknown gunmen.

References

External links
 Christian Science Monitor
Article at Islamonline.net

Living people
Fatah members
Shooting survivors
1947 births
Palestinian amputees
Ambassadors of the State of Palestine to Egypt
Ambassadors of the State of Palestine to Russia
Palestinian expatriates in Syria